Harding County is a county in the U.S. state of South Dakota. As of the 2020 census, the population was 1,311, making it the third-least populous county in South Dakota. Its county seat is Buffalo.

Harding County was established as a county in the Dakota Territory on 5 March 1881, but was not organized at that time. Its name recognized J. A. Harding, who had been Speaker of the House of Dakota Territory. Its boundaries were altered in 1883, in 1889, and in 1894. On 8 November 1898, Harding County was dissolved and its territory assigned to Butte County. However, on 3 November 1908, it was again created (with altered boundaries) from Butte County's area, and on 17 February 1909 its governing organization was completed.

Geography
Harding County lies at the northwest corner of South Dakota. Its western boundary line abuts the east boundary line of the state of Montana, and its north boundary line abuts the south boundary line of the state of North Dakota. Its terrain consists of high hills, generally sloping to the east. Its highest point is a ridge that runs northwest to southeast near the county's southwest corner, at 3,366' (1026m) ASL.

It is the fourth-largest county in South Dakota by area.

Major highways
  U.S. Highway 85
  South Dakota Highway 20
  South Dakota Highway 79

Adjacent counties

 Bowman County, North Dakota - north
 Adams County, North Dakota - northeast
 Perkins County - east
 Butte County - south
 Carter County, Montana - west
 Fallon County, Montana - northwest

Protected areas
 Custer National Forest (partial)
 Gardner Lake State Game Production Area
 Mallula State Game Production Area
 State Experiment Farm and Antelope Reserve

Lakes
 Lake Gardner - it is 203 acres in surface area and is approximately 14 feet deep at its deepest point.  Channel Catfish, Largemouth Bass, Walleye, Yellow Bullhead, and Yellow Perch inhabit the lake.
 Leger Dam
 Rabbit Creek Dam - this lake has a surface area of 17 acres and is inhabited by a variety of warm water fish including Largemouth Bass.
 Vessey Dam - Eight acres in size, this lake is stocked with rainbow trout.

Demographics

2000 census
As of the 2000 United States Census, there were 1,353 people, 525 households, and 352 families in the county. The population density was 0.5 people per square mile (0.2/km2).  There were 804 housing units at an average density of 0.3 per square mile (0.1/km2). The racial makeup of the county, as defined by the US Census was 97.63% White, 0.30% Black or African American, 0.74% Native American, 0.59% Asian, 0.37% from other races, and 0.37% from two or more races. 1.63% of the population were Hispanic or Latino of any race. 25.9% were of German, 24.3% Norwegian, 12.8% American, 7.1% Irish and 6.6% English ancestry.

There were 525 households, out of which 35.0% had children under the age of 18 living with them, 58.5% were married couples living together, 5.3% had a female householder with no husband present, and 32.8% were non-families. 31.0% of all households were made up of individuals, and 14.5% had someone living alone who was 65 years of age or older. The average household size was 2.50 and the average family size was 3.19.

The county population contained 32.5% under the age of 18, 4.4% from 18 to 24, 24.8% from 25 to 44, 24.8% from 45 to 64, and 13.4% who were 65 years of age or older. The median age was 38 years. For every 100 females there were 104.7 males. For every 100 females age 18 and over, there were 102.0 males.

The median income for a household in the county was $25,000, and the median income for a family was $31,667. Males had a median income of $25,556 versus $16,375 for females. The per capita income for the county was $12,794. About 19.40% of families and 21.10% of the population were below the poverty line, including 22.80% of those under age 18 and 22.50% of those age 65 or over.

2010 census
As of the 2010 United States Census, there were 1,255 people, 539 households, and 348 families in the county. The racial makeup of the county was 95.9% white, 1.5% American Indian, 0.1% black or African American, 0.1% Asian, 0.7% from other races, and 1.7% from two or more races. Those of Hispanic or Latino origin made up 1.6% of the population. In terms of ancestry, 41.4% were Norwegian, 31.8% were German, 18.4% were Irish, 13.2% were English, and 2.6% were American.

Of the 539 households, 26.0% had children under the age of 18 living with them, 55.5% were married couples living together, 4.8% had a female householder with no husband present, 35.4% were non-families, and 32.1% of all households were made up of individuals. The average household size was 2.27 and the average family size was 2.87. The median age was 43.3 years.

The median income for a household in the county was $34,792 and the median income for a family was $46,111. Males had a median income of $38,929 versus $20,924 for females. The per capita income for the county was $22,004. About 13.7% of families and 16.1% of the population were below the poverty line, including 19.5% of those under age 18 and 16.9% of those age 65 or over.

Politics
Harding is a heavily Republican county in Presidential and Congressional elections. The last Democrat to win a majority in the county was Franklin D. Roosevelt in his 46-state 1936 landslide. Jimmy Carter in 1976 almost carried the county, but since then the solitary Democrat to top 22 percent of Harding County's ballots has been Michael Dukakis in the drought-influenced 1988 election – and none of the last seven Democratic presidential candidates have topped so much as twenty percent. In 2008, Republican John McCain won 78% of the county's vote, while in 2012 Mitt Romney won 86% of the vote, and Donald Trump in 2016 won 90%, his strongest showing in South Dakota, with Hillary Clinton narrowly securing second place from Gary Johnson.

In the South Dakota Senate Harding is part of the 28th Senate district, which is held by Republican Betty Olson. In the State House Harding is part of district 28B, which is held by Republican J. Sam Marty.

Communities

Towns
 Buffalo (county seat)
 Camp Crook

Unincorporated communities

 Harding
 Karinen
 Ladner
 Ludlow
 Ralph
 Redig
 Reva

Ghost Towns
 Bullock
 Gustave

See also
 National Register of Historic Places listings in Harding County, South Dakota
 Dogie Butte

References

 
1909 establishments in South Dakota
Populated places established in 1909